Patrick Skene Catling (born 14 February 1925) is a British journalist, author and book reviewer best known for writing The Chocolate Touch in 1952. He has written 12 novels, 3 works of non fiction and 9 books for children.

Background
Catling was born and schooled in London and was educated there and at Oberlin College in the United States. Catling served in the Royal Canadian Air Force as a navigator and as a journalist at The Baltimore Sun and The Manchester Guardian.

He has traveled extensively. His present home is in the Republic of Ireland. He continues writing books, and writes reviews for The Spectator, The Telegraph, and other publications.

Career
His first publication of The Chocolate Touch in 1952 received enthusiastic responses from several reviewers. Catling has since written dozens of books, and has developed the popular The Chocolate Touch character John Midas into the children's book series: John Midas in the Dreamtime (1986), John Midas and the Vampires (1994), John Midas and the Radio Touch (1994), and John Midas and the Rock Star (1995). Of John Midas in the Dreamtime, School Library Journal wrote, "...children who have been dragged around tourist sights will relate to John's boredom".

Selected works
The Chocolate Touch
Better Than Working
John Midas in the Dreamtime
The Exterminator
Jazz, Jazz, Jazz
The Experiment
Best Summer Job
Tourist Attraction
Freddy Hill: The Story of a Modern Man of Pleasure
Eskimo Surprise
Chocolate Magic
The Catalogue
John Midas and the Vampires
John Midas and the Radio Touch
A Trunkful of Tricks
John Midas and the Rock Star

Journalism
  Review of

References

External links
 

1925 births
Living people
20th-century English novelists
British writers of young adult literature
English children's writers
English fantasy writers
English male short story writers
English short story writers
English male novelists
Oberlin College alumni
20th-century British short story writers
20th-century English male writers
Royal Canadian Air Force personnel of World War II